Shawkat Ali (12 February 1936 – 25 January 2018) was a Bangladeshi writer. He was awarded Bangla Academy Literary Award in 1968 and Ekushey Padak in 1990 by the Government of Bangladesh.

Early life and education
Ali was born in Raiganj in West Dinajpur district in British India. He passed his IA from Surendranath College in 1951 and BA in 1955. He completed his MA in Bengali literature from the University of Dhaka in 1958.

Career
Ali started writing articles in newspapers in 1955. He started his career at the news desk of Dainik Millat in the same year. He worked in Thakurgaon as a schoolteacher for six months. He taught Bengali at Jagannath College in Dhaka between 1962 and 1987. He joined the Dhaka head office of District Gazetteer as an assistant director and later became its director. He was appointed principal of Government Music College in 1989 from where he retired in 1993.

Works
Ali's notable novels include Prodoshe Prakritojon (1984), Opekkha (1984) and Dakkhinyaoner Din (1985). Prodoshe Prakritojon is his most notable – which tells the story of the oppression faced by the lower-caste people in the Sena Empire that ruled the Bengal through 11th and 12th centuries. Uttarer Khep was adapted into a film of the same name in 2000. The film won the Bangladesh National Film Award for Best Actress for the performance by Champa.

Novels
Pingal Akash (The Reddish-Brown Sky, 1963)
Jaatra (Journey, 1976)
Prodoshe Praakritajon (The Commoners in the Twiltghat, 1984)
Apeksha (Waiting, 1985)
Dakshinayaner Din (The Days of Southward Way, 1985)
Kulyaai Kalasrot (Time the Flow of in a Bird's Nest, 1986)
Purbaratri Purbadin (The Night Before, the Day Before, 1986)
Sambal (Saving, 1986)
Gantabye Atahpar (After towards Destinations, 1987)
Bhalobasa Kare Kay (What is Love Called, 1988)
Jete Chai (I want to Go, 1988)
Warish (The Successor, 1989)
Basar O Madhucandrima (Bride-Chamber and Honey Moon, 1990)
Uttarer Khep (A Trip to the North, 1991)
Tripodi (2002)

Awards
 Bangla Academy Literary Award (1968)
 Humayun Kabir Memorial Award
 Lekhak Shibir Medal (1978)
 Ajit Guha Literary Prize (1982)
 Philips Literary Award (1986 and 1989)
 Ekushey Padak (1990)

Personal life
Ali has Three sons.

References 

1936 births
2018 deaths
University of Dhaka alumni
Bangladeshi essayists
Academic staff of Jagannath University
Bangladeshi male novelists
People from Uttar Dinajpur district
Recipients of Bangla Academy Award
Recipients of the Ekushey Padak 
Writers from West Bengal